Christina Kim is an American golfer.

Christina Kim may also refer to:

 Christina M. Kim, American television writer
 Christina Kim (fashion designer) (born 1956), American fashion designer and founder of design house Dosa

See also
Kristina Kim (born 1989), Russian taekwondo practitioner